The Best of Science Fiction, published in 1946, is an anthology  of  science fiction anthologies edited by American critic and editor Groff Conklin.

Contents
 "Concerning Science Fiction," an essay by John W. Campbell
 Introduction by Groff Conklin
 "Solution Unsatisfactory" (1941) by Robert A. Heinlein, credited as Anson MacDonald
 "The Great War Syndicate" (abridged) (1888) by Frank R. Stockton
 "The Piper's Son" (1945) by Henry Kuttner and C. L. Moore, credited as Lewis Padgett
 "Deadline" (1944) by Cleve Cartmill
 "Lobby" (1944) by Clifford D. Simak
 "Blowups Happen" (1940) by Robert A. Heinlein, credited as Anson MacDonald
 "Atomic Power" (1934) by John W. Campbell, credited as Don A. Stuart
 "Killdozer!" (1944) by Theodore Sturgeon
 "Davey Jones' Ambassador" (1935) by Raymond Z. Gallun
 "Giant in the Earth" (1933) by Morrison Colladay
 "Goldfish Bowl" (1942) by Robert A. Heinlein, credited as Anson MacDonald
 "The Ivy War" (1930) by David H. Keller
 "Liquid Life" (1936) by Ralph Milne Farley
 "A Tale of the Ragged Mountains" (1844) by Edgar Allan Poe
 "The Great Keinplatz Experiment" (1885) by Arthur Conan Doyle
 "The Remarkable Case of Davidson's Eyes" (1895) by H. G. Wells
 "The Tissue-Culture King" (1926) by Julian Huxley
 "The Ultimate Catalyst" (1939) by Eric Temple Bell, credited as John Taine
 "The Terrible Sense" (1938) by Thomas Calvert McClary, credited as Calvin Peregoy
 "A Scientist Divides" (1934) by Donald Wandrei
 "Tricky Tonnage" (1944) by Malcolm Jameson
 "The Lanson Screen" (1936) by Arthur Leo Zagat
 "The Ultimate Metal" (1935) by Nat Schachner
 "The Machine" (1935) by John W. Campbell, credited as Don A. Stuart
 "Short-Circuited Probability" (1941) by Norman L. Knight
 "The Search" (1942) by A. E. van Vogt
 "The Upper Level Road" (1935) by F. Orlin Tremaine, credited as Warner Van Lorne
 "The 32nd of May" (1935) by Paul Ernst
 "The Monster from Nowhere" (1939) by Nelson S. Bond
 "First Contact" (1945) by Murray Leinster
 "Universe" (1941) by Robert A. Heinlein
 "Blind Alley" (1945) by Isaac Asimov
 "En Route to Pluto" (1936) by Wallace West
 "The Retreat to Mars" (1927) by Cecil B. White
 "The Man Who Saved the Earth" (1919) by Austin Hall
 "Spawn of the Stars" (1930) by Charles Willard Diffin
 "The Flame Midget" (1936) by Frank Belknap Long
 "Expedition" (1943) by Anthony Boucher
 "The Conquest of Gola" (1931) by Leslie F. Stone
 "Jackdaw" (1942) by Ross Rocklynne

External links 
 The Best of Science Fiction at ISFDB

1946 anthologies
American anthologies
Groff Conklin anthologies